Rachel F. Elson is an American journalist and editor-in-chief of Financial Planning Magazine and its associated website Financial-Planning.com. She was previously managing editor at Inc.com and CBS MoneyWatch.com. She is a recipient of the 2009 Gerald Loeb Award for Online excellence in business journalism for the story "Middle Class Crunch".

A graduate of the University of Pennsylvania, Elson was previously an editor at MSN Money, the New York Post, and Salon.com.

She has been a freelance editor and reporter whose articles have appeared in Time Out New York, The Washington Post, Salon.com, People.com, the New York Post and The San Francisco Examiner.

References

External links

 Rachel Elson's professional website
 Rachel Elson's bio, Financial-Planning.com

Year of birth missing (living people)
Living people
University of Pennsylvania alumni
San Francisco Examiner people
San Francisco Chronicle people
The Washington Post people
Gerald Loeb Award winners for News Service, Online, and Blogging
Journalists from New York City
American women journalists
21st-century American women